These are the results from the diving competition at the 2001 World Aquatics Championships.

Medal table

Medal summary

Men

Women

 
2001 in diving
Diving
Diving at the World Aquatics Championships